Han-na is a Korean feminine given name.

List 
 Han-na Chang (born 1982), South Korean conductor and cellist
 Gwon Han-na (born 1989), South Korean handball player
 Kang Han-na (born 1989), South Korean actress

See also 
 Hanna (disambiguation)
 Hannah (name)

External links

Korean feminine given names